The Nancy and Stephen Grand Technion Energy Program (GTEP) or Grand Technion Energy Program was established in 2007 at Technion - Israel Institute of Technology, which is Israel's first university, founded in 1912.

Overview
GTEP's stated aim is to bring together Technion's researchers to discover and tap alternative and renewable energy sources, promote more efficient energy use, and reduce the environmental damage caused by the production of fossil fuels.

GTEP is interdisciplinary, with members spanning the range from nano science through to applied engineering.

The stated GTEP mission is:

 To support energy projects with global impact
 To promote multidisciplinary cooperation
 To build on Israel and Technion's existing strengths in energy research and application
 To attract new faculty into energy research
 To attract graduate students
 To strengthen industrial & international cooperation
 To raise awareness in Israel and across the world of energy issues
 
More than 40 faculty members from nine Technion faculties are involved in GTEP projects.

GTEP's four-point strategy

Alternative fuels
 Non-carbon fuels
 Hydrogen technologies
 Biomass-based fuels

Renewable energy sources
 Solar thermal technologies
 Photovoltaic cells
 Wind power

Energy storage and conversion
fuel cells
batteries

Energy conservation
 Conservation-minded urban planning
 Insulation substances
 Smart windows that can deflect sunlight as needed
 Combustion processes

National leadership

In 2011, GTEP submitted the winning proposal to the Israel Science Foundation, through the framework of the Israeli Centers for Research Excellence (I-CORE). As proposal coordinator, GTEP is coordinating top researchers to advance research into Solar fuels from Technion, the Weizmann Institute of Science and Ben-Gurion University of the Negev. The I-CORE for Solar Fuels includes nine existing faculty members from each university and 3 new faculty members in each school (a total of 36 members).

Notable GTEP faculty members
 Prof. Yoed Tsur, GTEP Director, Technion Faculty of Chemical Engineering.
 Prof. Gideon Grader, Founder and Former GTEP Director, Technion Faculty of Chemical Engineering.
 Prof. Avner Rothschild, Technion Faculty of Materials Engineering.
 Prof. Yair Ein-Eli, Technion Faculty of Materials
 Prof. Ilan Riess, Technion Faculty of Physics.
 Prof. Nir Tessler, Technion Faculty of Electrical Engineering.
 Prof. Gadi Schuster, Technion Faculty of Biology.
 Prof. Avner Rothschild, Technion Faculty of Materials Science and Engineering
 Prof. Lilac Amirav, Technion Schulich Faculty of Chemistry
 Prof. David Greenblatt, Technion Faculty of Mechanical Engineering .

Technion faculties involved with GTEP

 Aerospace Engineering
 Architecture and Town Planning
 Biology
 Biotechnology and Food Engineering
 Chemical Engineering
 Chemistry
 Civil and Environmental Engineering
 Electrical Engineering
 Materials Engineering
 Mechanical Engineering
 Physics
 Mathematics

GTEP International Graduate Studies Program

GTEP houses Israel's only multidisciplinary graduate studies program in energy science and technology.
 MSc in Energy Engineering
 MSc in Energy
 PhD Program

References

External links
 GTEP website
 GTEP blog on Blogspot

2007 establishments in Israel
Educational institutions established in 2007
Technion – Israel Institute of Technology
Multidisciplinary research institutes
Research institutes in Israel
Renewable energy in Israel
Science and technology in Israel
Energy in Israel
Energy development